A shelter magazine is a periodical publication with an editorial focus on interior design, architecture, home furnishings, and often gardening.

The term is most often used in the U.S. magazine publishing trade. The earliest example of this "chiefly N[orth] Amer[ican]" meaning recorded by the Oxford English Dictionary is from a New York Times article published on July 3, 1946, in reference to Your Own Home, a "shelter magazine devoted to low-cost housing", which was reported to have gained a new advertising manager.

Examples of US shelter magazines

 Architectural Digest
 Better Homes and Gardens
 Country Life in America (1901–1942)
 Country Living
 The Craftsman
 Desert Magazine
 Domino
 Dwell
 Elle Decor
 House Beautiful
 House Method
 House & Garden
 Lonny
 Martha Stewart Living
 Metropolitan Home
 Midwest Living
 Southern Living
 Sunset
 This Old House
 Traditional Home
 Veranda

Shelter Magazine is also the title of a trade magazine for builders in the U.S.

Notes

Lifestyle magazines published in the United States
Magazines published in the United States